La Concordia is a municipality in the Jinotega department of Nicaragua.

Twin towns
La Concordia is twinned with:

  Canfranc, Spain

Municipalities of the Jinotega Department